KFSH-FM (95.9 MHz, "95.9 The Fish") is a commercial radio station that is licensed to La Mirada, California and serves Orange County and southern Los Angeles County. The station is owned by Salem Media Group and has broadcast a contemporary Christian music (CCM) format since 2000. The station has studios in Glendale, with the transmitter based in the city of Orange. The branding refers to the ichthys, the ancient fish icon used by the Christian church since its birth during the time of the Roman Empire; the ichthys itself is part of the station logo.

History

Early years

The station at 95.9 FM in Orange County, California has its origins in KEZY, which first signed on in 1959 at 1190 AM from its studios at the Disneyland Hotel in Anaheim with a 1,000-watt signal. The first voice heard on KEZY was that of canine TV star Lassie. Lassie's owner, Rudd Weatherwax, was an investor in the station and the hotel. It was first known as "K-Easy" as it broadcast an easy listening music format. In the late 1960s, KEZY moved its studios and offices off the Disneyland campus to a larger complex located (coincidentally) at 1190 East Ball Road in Anaheim. Accompanying the relocation was a switch to a top 40 pop/rock format.

KEZY-FM ("96 FM KEZY") signed on April 17, 1961 with an 870-watt signal and simulcast its AM sister station. Originally, its city of license was Anaheim and its transmitter was located in Villa Park. Since its inception, the station has hosted a number of formats, including a successful top 40 format throughout the 1980s. In 1989, Anaheim Broadcasting Corporation sold KEZY-FM and its AM counterpart, then known as KORG, to M.L. Media Partners L.P.; the new owners soon switched the format to adult contemporary. From 1993 to 1996, it was the flagship station for National Hockey League expansion team the Mighty Ducks of Anaheim. In the mid-1990s, KEZY advertised with the slogan "Hits of the '80s and '90s with no rap or hard rock, 95.9 The All New KEZY"; this was intended to attract listeners uninterested in hip hop music during its rise in popularity. Air staff during this time included John Fox (previously at KFMB-FM in San Diego), Liz Pennington, April Whitney, Carolyn Hogenrad, and music director Scott Free.

Starting in 1998, KEZY-FM went through a series of ownership changes. First, Jacor Communications bought the station and its AM counterpart KORG in September for $30.1 million. Then in October, Clear Channel Communications, then the largest U.S. radio broadcasting group, purchased Jacor in a $4.4 billion deal. During this time, the station changed its call letters to KXMX, completed the construction permit for a power increase, and branded the station with its corporate "Mix" format. New on-air personalities included Angel and Randy "Ranman" DeWitt (formerly of KHTS-FM in San Diego). The Mix briefly maintained a remote studio at The Block at Orange shopping center. This format lasted only a year; it was also the last format as a secular station.

KFSH — "95.9 The Fish" (2000–present)
In 2000, as part of conditions set by the Federal Communications Commission (FCC) to approve its merger with AMFM Inc., Clear Channel sold KXMX and seven other stations to Salem Communications Corporation, a commercial radio company specializing in Christian programming. Salem changed the call letters to KFSH and flipped the station to contemporary Christian music (CCM) with the branding "The Fish" on August 25, 2000 at 6 a.m. This format has since been replicated at other Salem radio stations nationwide. KFSH relocated to the Salem Los Angeles studios in Glendale, about ten miles north of Downtown Los Angeles, sharing facilities with then-sister stations KXMX, KKLA-FM, KRLA, and KTIE. The Ball Road studios of the former KEZY in Anaheim, often referred to as "the dumpy little building on Ball Road" by morning DJ John Fox, were demolished in 2008; the land was absorbed into the neighboring Ganahl Lumber Yard. KFSH's city of license, however, remained Anaheim until November 2008, when it was changed to La Mirada, approximately five to six miles northwest, near the Los Angeles—Orange county line.

On January 16, 2012, KFSH-FM began airing the nationally syndicated program Delilah each weeknight. This marked the return of the request-and-dedication show to the Los Angeles area since it was last broadcast on KBIG. It also launched the CCM version of Delilah; the mainstream version of the program is delivered to affiliate stations in a secular adult contemporary music format. KFSH-FM dropped the show on April 16, 2020 and replaced it with Keep the Faith with Penny, originating from sister station WFSH-FM in Atlanta.

In early 2018, KFSH-FM began RDS broadcasting, providing song artists and titles on capable devices.

Transmission issues
KFSH-FM is classified as being in the Los Angeles radio market and previously was marketed as such ("The Fish LA"). However, the station's 6,000-watt signal can be heard clearly only in Orange County, its primary service area for most of its history, and south of Downtown Los Angeles. Generally, the stereo signal is unable to be received in northern Los Angeles County, including the San Fernando Valley. This is due to interference from KCAQ, a Class B1 station in Camarillo that operates on the same frequency and to which KFSH-FM is short spaced. The station changed its domain to thefishoc.com to better reflect its primary broadcast area.

FishFest

Since 2002, KFSH-FM has hosted FishFest, an annual contemporary Christian music festival held in early summer. Through 2016, the concert was held at the Irvine Meadows Amphitheatre in Irvine, California. With the closure of the venue in October 2016, the 2017 edition of FishFest was relocated to Honda Center.

References

External links

KFSH FishFest concert series

FSH-FM
Mass media in Orange County, California
Radio stations established in 1961
1961 establishments in California
Salem Media Group properties
FSH-FM